Starfall is the third album released by the power metal band Dragonland, and the first not to deal with "The Dragonland Chronicles". The music for Starfall was mainly written between June 2003 and May 2004 after arriving home from their 2003 Japan tour. The song, "To the End of the World", from this album, was performed during that tour, before it was even recorded. A demo version of "As Madness Took Me" can be found on YouTube.

Track listing

Japanese bonus tracks

Korean bonus track

Thematic meanings
In a 2004 interview with Metal Rules, guitarist Olof Mörck talked to Anders Sandvall, and in the interview Mörck goes into detail about "The Book of Shadows" trilogy and the story behind the songs:
"The Book Of Shadows is a story told in three chapters, being an adventurous epic with a movie script like feel to enhance what’s going on in the music. It starts out in Oxford, Great Britain in the late 19th century with the finding of an ancient tome, known as The Book Of Shadows. The stories and secrets it contains eventually leads to sojourns to Egypt, and the terrible findings unleashed there, once again springs to life in the last part, which is set in modern day USA. The story I wrote for it is archaically momentous, containing more writing than both previous albums lyrics combined."

The song "Calling My Name" contains sound clips by Charles Manson from the 7 March 1986 San Quentin Prison interview with Charlie Rose for CBS News Nightwatch.

"The Shores of Our Land" tells the story of a group of Vikings returning home after a successful battle. It includes a feast scene in the middle, which was recorded by a very intoxicated Dragonland.

Personnel
 Jonas Heidgert - vocals
 Olof Mörck - lead guitar
 Nicklas Magnusson - rhythm guitar
 Christer Pedersen - bass
 Elias Holmlid - keyboards, synthesizers
 Jesse Lindskog - drums

Guest musicians
 Johanna Andersson - female vocals on "The Shores of Our Land"
 Tom S. Englund of Evergrey - guitar solo and backing vocals on "Calling My Name" and "The Shores of Our Land"
 Henrik Danhage of Evergrey - guitar solo on "The Shores of Our Land"

Production
 Mixed and Engineered by: Arnold Lindberg
 Mastered by: Dragan Tanaskovic at Bohus Mastering, Sweden

Credits
 Cover Art by: ToxicAngel
 Band Photos by: Olle Carlsson

References

2004 albums
Dragonland albums